Yeoryia Tsiliggiri (born 21 June 1972 in Piraeus) is a retired Greek track and field athlete who specialised in the pole vault. She competed at the 2004 Summer Olympics in Athens without qualifying for the final.

She has personal bests of 4.47 metres outdoors (2004) and 4.37 metres indoors (2002).

Competition record

References

1972 births
Living people
Greek female pole vaulters
Athletes (track and field) at the 2004 Summer Olympics
Olympic athletes of Greece
Athletes from Piraeus
Athletes (track and field) at the 2001 Mediterranean Games
Mediterranean Games competitors for Greece